The siege of Danzig took place between 1655 and 1660 when a Swedish force tried to capture this important Baltic Sea port city from the Polish–Lithuanian Commonwealth during the Second Northern War. After 5 years of fighting around Danzig (Gdańsk), the Swedish force which has made little ground surrendered.

Chronology
 1655
 Swedish naval forces blocked Danzig's harbor – trade was suspended.
 Swedish land forces capture the fortress Danziger Haupt (Głowa Gdańska, Danzig Head) – very important water gate on Vistula River
 1656, July – Dutch naval forces comes to Gdańsk Bay and unblock Danzig's harbor.
 1656, September – Treaty of Elbing: siege lifted due to Dutch intervention
 1659, 26 October – Poles defeated the Swedes in a skirmish near Danziger Haupt.
 1659, 22 December – Swedish garrison of the fortress Danziger Haupt capitulated.
 1660, May – Treaty of Oliva was signed. End of war.

Danzig all of that time was unconquered and remain loyal to Polish–Lithuanian Commonwealth.

References
 http://www.zum.de/whkmla/region/eceurope/danzig15571660.html

Further reading
 "Dzieje Gdańska", Edmund Cieślak, Czesław Biernat. Wydawnictwo Morskie Gdańsk, 1969

Second Northern War
Conflicts in 1655
1655 in Europe
Danzig
Danzig
History of Gdańsk
Sieges involving the Dutch Republic
Events in Gdańsk